Radium Springs may refer to:

Canada
Radium Hot Springs, a village in British Columbia
 Radium Hot Springs Airport

United States
Radium Springs, Georgia
Radium Springs, New Mexico
Radium Hot Springs, Colorado

See also
Radium (disambiguation)